Masterbike is a contest held on an annual basis to determine the best sport bikes of the year. Motociclismo, a Spanish sport bike magazine, invites cooperating magazines from all over the world (In Moto and Motosprint for Italy, Motociclismo Spain, Motociclismo Brazil, Motorrad, PS, Kickstart, MCN, Australian MCN, Cycle World, Motosprint, In Moto, Moto, Motociclismo Mexico, Motociclismo Portugal, Bike, Bike India, and Motorcyclist) and motorcycle manufacturers as well to join this pure racetrack comparison test. Categories are broken into Supersport, Superbike, and Maxisport. Winners are determined by a rating that is the attribution of the score for the best lap time overall (40%), the fastest lap set for each rider (40%) and the individual rating by each rider (20%). Only the winners of Supersport, Superbike and Maxisport class reach the final comparison where an overall Masterbike winner is chosen for the year.

Results

2005 

Masterbike 2005 was the 8th annual Masterbike. It took place on the Ricardo Tormo circuit at Valencia on 15 June 2005 directly after the Superbike World Championship race weekend.

2006 

Masterbike 2006 was the 9th annual Masterbike. It took place on the Jerez circuit in Spain on 31 May 2006.

2007 

Masterbike 2007 was the 10th annual Masterbike. It took place on the Jerez circuit in Spain in May, 2007.

2008 

Masterbike 2008 was the 11th annual Masterbike. It took place at Albacete Circuit in Spain.

References

Motorcycle magazines
Motorcycling events